Zakir Hussain Gesawat, (( 5 July 1970) is a politician and the Former Member of Legislative Assembly (MLA) of Makrana for the state of Rajasthan, India. He is current candidate for Indian National Congress for 113, Makrana Assembly. He is president of Congress Committee, Nagaur District from 11 February 2016. He was also elected as Congress Candidate for the Rajasthan Assembly Election in 2013. He has been serving Indian National Congress for the past 20 years. He was also the president of Makrana Marble Vikas Samiti, a local marble mining industry.

Early life

Zakir Hussain Gesawat was born in Middle Class Silawat Family in Makrana, He was student of Anjuman School, Makrana and left the education as because of family responsibilities in early age. He was always ambitious student who holds perfect leadership qualities. He always like to be a leader which resulted that he become a successful political hero due to his good performance in helping poor and needy people though the medium of development in infrastructure, education, health care and employment opportunities in social interests.

Political career
Zakir Hussain Gesawat was elected as MLA in Rajasthan Assembly 2008 election. He was elected as MLA. He was defeated by Shreeram Bhincher in Rajasthan Assembly Election 2013 with a huge margin difference. He is Candidate for Indian National Congress from Makrana Assembly of Rajasthan (113) for Assembly Election 2018 of Rajasthan.

External link 
Zakir Hussain Gesawat on Facebook

Rajasthan Assembly Election of 2018 
He is able to get Indian National Congress Party ticket for Rajasthan Assembly Election 2018 from Makrana Assembly. In Makrana, there is direct fight between Rooparam Muravatiya of Bhartiya Janta Party and Zakir Hussain Gesawat of Congress party. It was very close fight between both of them. Roopa Ram Muravatiya is able to win the election by a very narrow Margin of 1072 Votes.

Membership of Committee of House 2010-2014
 Member, Committee on Petitions (2010–2011) 
 Member, Committee on Petitions (2009–2010)
 Member, Committee on Petitions (2011–2012)
 Member, Committee on Estimates "A" (2010–2011)
 Member, Committee on Estimates "A" (2011–2012)
 Member, Committee on Welfare of Minorities (2012–2013)
 Member, Committee on Welfare of Minorities (2013–2014)

Rajasthan Assembly Election of 2013 
Contenders for Makrana constituency were:
 Shri Zakir Hussain
 Shri Abdul Aziz, Former Minister, Nonpartisan 
 Dr. Bhanwar Lal Rajpurohit, Nonpartisan 
 Bhanwar Singh, Jago Party
 Shri Iqbal Khan, Nonpartisan 
 Madhu Parmar, Samajwadi Party
 Shri Narayan Ram, CPIM
 Shri Rakesh Dave, Bahujan Samaj Party 
 Shreeram Bhincher, BJP
 Shri Suresh, Nonpartisan
 Shri Parsaram, Nonpartisan
 Shri Ram, Nonpartisan
 Shri Deeparam, Nonpartisan

Person in Bold has won the constituency election.

References

1970 births
Living people
Rajasthani politicians